List of Guggenheim Fellowships awarded in 1983.

1983 U.S. and Canadian Fellows
 Lennart Anderson, American painter and distinguished professor emeritus of painting and drawing at Brooklyn College
 Richard P. Brickner, writer; member of the writing workshops faculty, New School for Social Research
 Annette W. Coleman, professor of biology at Brown University
 Edwin M. Duval, professor of French at Yale University
 Paul Gottfried, professor at Elizabethtown College
 John Harding, photographer
 David Gries, professor of computer science at Cornell University
 Marcia K. Johnson, professor of psychology at Princeton University
 John Melby, composer of classical music
 James R. Mellow, biographer
 Boris Moishezon, professor of mathematics at Columbia University
Julian Moynahan, professor of English literature at Rutgers University
 Annabel Patterson, professor of English at Duke University
 Alvin E. Roth, professor of economics at Harvard University's Harvard Business School.
 Howard J. Schnitzer, professor of physics at Brandeis University
 Joan Snyder, American painter from New York
 Ted Stamm, American painter from New York
 Elizabeth C. Traugott, professor of linguistics at Stanford University
 Enrico Mario Santí, Cuban-American writer, poet, and scholar of Spanish American Literature

See also
Guggenheim Fellowship

References

External links
List of 1983 Fellows at the John Simon Guggenheim Memorial Foundation webpage

1983
1983 awards